Roy Steiner may refer to:
Roy Steiner (dancer), American tap dancer of The Steiner Brothers
Rebel Roy Steiner, Sr, American football player